Horní Domaslavice is a municipality and village in Frýdek-Místek District in the Moravian-Silesian Region of the Czech Republic. It has about 1,000 inhabitants.

Geography
The municipality lies in the Moravian-Silesian Foothills on the Lučina River.

History

The village was first mentioned in a Latin document of Diocese of Wrocław called Liber fundationis episcopatus Vratislaviensis from around 1305 as Domaslawitz utroque. It meant that there were already two villages of that name (utroque meaning "both" in Latin), the other being Dolní Domaslavice. 

Politically the village belonged initially to the Duchy of Teschen. In 1327 the duchy became a fee of the Kingdom of Bohemia, which after 1526 became part of the Habsburg monarchy.

The village became a seat of a Catholic parish, mentioned in the register of Peter's Pence payment from 1447 among 50 parishes of Teschen deanery as Domaslowicz.

After the 1540s Protestant Reformation prevailed in the Duchy of Teschen and a local Catholic church was taken over by Lutherans. It was taken from them (as one from around fifty buildings) in the region by a special commission and given back to the Roman Catholic Church on 24 March 1654.

After Revolutions of 1848 in the Austrian Empire a modern municipal division was introduced in the re-established Austrian Silesia. The village as a municipality was subscribed to the political and legal district of Cieszyn. According to the censuses conducted in 1880–1910 the population of the municipality dropped from 798 in 1880 to 789 in 1910 with a majority being native Czech-speakers (between 94.2% and 97.8%) accompanied by a small Polish-speaking minority (at most 29 or 3.7% in 1900) and German-speaking (at most 40 or 5% in 1880). In terms of religion in 1910 majority were Roman Catholics (98.6%), followed by Protestants (10 or 1.3%) and 1 Jew.

After World War I, Polish–Czechoslovak War and the division of Cieszyn Silesia in 1920, it became a part of Czechoslovakia. Following the Munich Agreement, in October 1938 together with the Zaolzie region it was annexed by Poland, administratively adjoined to Cieszyn County of Silesian Voivodeship. It was then annexed by Nazi Germany at the beginning of World War II. After the war it was restored to Czechoslovakia.

Sights
The landmark of Horní Domaslavice is the Church of Saint James the Great. It was built in the Baroque style in 1740–1745.

References

External links

 

Villages in Frýdek-Místek District
Cieszyn Silesia